The 2007 FIBA Europe Under-18 Championship Division C was the 6th edition of the Division C of the FIBA U18 European Championship, the third tier of the European men's under-18 basketball championship. It was played in Cardiff, Wales, from 16 to 21 July 2007. Scotland men's national under-18 basketball team won the tournament.

Participating teams

First round

Group A

Group B

Group C

1st–3rd place classification

4th–6th place classification

7th–9th place classification

Final standings

References

FIBA U18 European Championship Division C
2007–08 in European basketball
FIBA U18
Sports competitions in Wales
FIBA